Penelope Independent School District is a public school district based in Penelope, Texas (USA). In addition to Penelope, the district also serves the unincorporated community of Birome.  The district has one school Penelope School that serves students in grades pre-kindergarten through twelve.

The school and town were chronicled in the book "Where Dreams Die Hard" by Carlton Stowers, which follows the team for an entire season of football (after dropping the sport for 40 years, the school resumed play in 2000).  In 2007, Penelope made the football playoffs for the first time in school history, though it lost in the first round.

Academic achievement
In 2009, the school district was rated "academically acceptable" by the Texas Education Agency.

Special programs

Athletics
Penelope High School offers six-man football, volleyball, basketball, track and field, and cross country running.

See also

List of school districts in Texas

References

External links
Penelope ISD

School districts in Hill County, Texas